James Franklin Slagle (July 11, 1873 – May 10, 1956), nicknamed both "Rabbit" and "Shorty", was a professional baseball player who played as an outfielder in Major League Baseball (MLB) from 1899 to 1908. In his 10 MLB seasons, he played for four teams, all in the National League. He batted left-handed and threw right-handed.

Slagle began his professional career in minor league baseball (MiLB) in 1895. In 1898, he won the Western League batting title with a .378 average. He spent four seasons in MiLB before signing with the Washington Senators in 1899. He played one season in Washington, D. C. before signing with the Philadelphia Phillies when the Senators folded. Over the next two season, he played for the Phillies and, for a short time, the Boston Beaneaters. In 1902, he signed with the Chicago Cubs, and stayed with the team for seven seasons. He was the Cubs' starting center fielder for three of their NL championships, from 1906 to 1908, which includes two World Series victories. Slagle became the first player to successfully accomplish a straight steal of home in World Series play.

His last MLB season was in 1908, and later played two more seasons in MiLB in 1909 and 1910. He later settled in Chicago, where he died in 1956, at the age of 82.

In 1300 games over 10 seasons, Slagle posted a .268 batting average (1343-for-5005) with 781 runs, 124 doubles, 56 triples, 2 home runs, 344 RBIs, 274 stolen bases, 619 bases on balls, .352 on-base percentage and .317 slugging percentage. Although on three straight Cubs pennant winners, he only appeared in the 1907 World Series,  batting .273 (6-for-22) with 3 runs, 3 RBI, 6 stolen bases and 2 walks.

See also
 List of Major League Baseball career stolen bases leaders

External links

1873 births
1956 deaths
Major League Baseball outfielders
19th-century baseball players
Baseball players from Pennsylvania
Chicago Cubs players
Washington Senators (1891–1899) players
Philadelphia Phillies players
Boston Beaneaters players
Omaha Omahogs players
Houston Buffaloes players
Grand Rapids Bob-o-links players
Kansas City Blues (baseball) players
Baltimore Orioles (IL) players